Óscar Manuel Pinto Marín (born 22 January 2002) is a Peruvian footballer who plays as a forward for Alianza Lima.

Career
In mid-February 2020, Pinto was bought by Alianza Lima and loaned out back to Universidad San Martín.

Career statistics

Club

Notes

References

2002 births
Living people
Peruvian footballers
Peru youth international footballers
Association football forwards
Club Deportivo Universidad de San Martín de Porres players
Club Alianza Lima footballers
Footballers from Lima